Hénault is a surname. Notable people with the surname include:

Charles-Jean-François Hénault (1685–1770), French historian
Ray Henault (born 1949), Canadian General